Choeung Ek is the site of a former orchard and mass grave of victims of the Khmer Rouge – killed between 1975 and 1979 – in Dangkao Section, Phnom Penh, Cambodia, about  south of the Phnom Penh city centre. It is the best-known of the sites known as the Killing Fields, where the Khmer Rouge regime executed over one million people between 1975 and 1979.

Description
Mass graves containing 8,895 bodies were discovered at Choeung Ek after the fall of the Khmer Rouge regime. Many of the dead were former political prisoners who were kept by the Khmer Rouge in their Tuol Sleng detention center and in other Cambodian detention centers.

Today, Choeung Ek is a memorial, marked by a Buddhist stupa. The stupa has acrylic glass sides and is filled with more than 5,000 human skulls. Some of the lower levels are opened during the day so that the skulls can be seen directly. Many have been shattered or smashed in.

Tourists are encouraged by the Cambodian government to visit Choeung Ek. Apart from the stupa, there are pits from which the bodies were exhumed. Human bones still litter the site.

On May 3, 2005, the Municipality of Phnom Penh announced that they had entered into a 30-year agreement with JC Royal Co. to develop the memorial at Choeung Ek.  As part of the agreement, they are not to disturb the remains still present in the field.

In popular culture
 The film The Killing Fields is a dramatised portrayal of events like those that took place at Choeung Ek.

References

External links
 
 

Cambodian genocide
Museums in Phnom Penh
Killing Fields